Jocelyn Goldfein is an American technology executive and investor. She is the managing director and a general partner at venture capital firm Zetta Venture Partners. Previously she was a director of engineering at Facebook and vice president of engineering at VMware.

Biography 
Goldfein attended Stanford University and graduated with a bachelor's degree in computer science in 1997. After college, Goldfein started her career at Trilogy. Later, she spent seven years at VMware, eventually becoming vice president of engineering. While at VMware, she worked on their core virtualization offering and began their desktop business. She moved on to become director of engineering at Facebook where her teams worked on several features, including news feed and search. She is the managing director and a general partner at venture capital firm Zetta Venture Partners, as well as a guest lecturer at Stanford University, angel investor, and advisor. She is a member of the board of Harvey Mudd College.

She spoke at the Grace Hopper Celebration of Women in Computing in 2012, and delivered a keynote address at Women 2.0's HowTo conference in 2014. In 2017, she was named to Business Insider's list of "43 Most Powerful Female Engineers."

Awards and acknowledgements  
 America's Top 50 Women in Tech, Forbes, Dec. 1, 2018

References 

Stanford University alumni
Facebook employees
Living people
Year of birth missing (living people)
Angel investors
American software engineers
American women engineers
21st-century women engineers
21st-century American women